, short for Lady Sports, is a Japanese science fiction comedy anime television series.  The anime will premiere on April 10, 2018.

Characters

Production
The series is directed by Hiroshi Kimura, and the theme song, "Happy Thinking", is performed by Aina Kusuda.  Auditions for the anime started in March 2018 on the Nama TV streaming service.

Release
The series will premiere on Tokyo MX on April 10, 2018.

Notes

References

Anime with original screenplays
Comedy anime and manga
Science fiction anime and manga
Tokyo MX original programming